Haver Peak is a small peak  south of Morrison Bluff in the Kohler Range of Marie Byrd Land, Antarctica. It was first photographed by U.S. Navy Operation Highjump, 1946–47, and was mapped by the United States Geological Survey from surveys and U.S. Navy air photos, 1959–66. It was named by the Advisory Committee on Antarctic Names after Lieutenant D.J. Haver, U.S. Navy, Assistant Officer in Charge of the Supply Department during Operation Deep Freeze 1965 and 1966.

References

Mountains of Marie Byrd Land